Kengeri is a western terminal metro station on the Purple Line of the Namma Metro serving the suburbs of Kengeri bordered by Nagarbhavi to the north and Rajarajeshwari Nagar to the east. Kengeri is a suburb of Bangalore in Karnataka, India. It was inaugurated on 29 August 2021 and was commenced to the public on 30 August 2021.

Station layout

Entry/Exit
There are 2 Entry/Exit points - A and B. Commuters can use either of the points for their travel.
Entry/Exit point A - Towards Challeghatta side
Entry/Exit point B - Towards Kengeri Police Station side

See also 

 Bangalore
 List of Namma Metro stations
 Transport in Karnataka
 List of metro systems
 List of rapid transit systems in India
 Bangalore portal

References 

Namma Metro stations
